David John Birnie (16 February 1951 – 7 October 2005) and Catherine Margaret Birnie (née Harrison; born 23 May 1951) were an Australian couple from Perth, Western Australia, who murdered four women at their home in 1986, and attempted to murder a fifth. These crimes were referred to in the press as the Moorhouse murders, after the Birnies' address at 3 Moorhouse Street in Willagee, a suburb of Perth.

David John Birnie
David Birnie was the oldest of five children and grew up in Wattle Grove, Western Australia, a semi-rural suburb of Perth. School friends and acquaintances from church remember the family as having been dysfunctional, and subject to frequent rumors involving alcoholism, promiscuity, and incest. The family never had regular meals together, and Birnie's parents did not cook meals for their children.

In the early 1960s, Birnie's parents decided to move the family to another Perth suburb, where Birnie met Catherine Harrison through mutual friends. At age 15, Birnie left school to become an apprentice jockey for Eric Parnham at the nearby Ascot Racecourse. During his time there, Birnie physically abused the horses and developed a habit of exhibitionism. One night, Birnie, wearing only stockings over his head, broke into the room of an elderly lady where he was boarding and attempted to rape her.

By the time he was an adolescent, Birnie had been in and out of prison for several misdemeanors and felonies. As an adult, he became addicted to sex and pornography, and was a paraphiliac. He married his first wife during his early 20s and the couple had a daughter, Tanya, who was aged 10 at the time of his arrest. Tanya, who has changed her surname since Birnie's capture, has never married and had no children, stating, "I don't wanna spawn another David Birnie".

In late 1986, at the time of the murders, Birnie was employed at a car wrecker's shop in Willagee, a suburb of Perth.

Catherine Margaret Birnie
Catherine Birnie was born Catherine Margaret Harrison on 23 May 1951. She was two years old when her mother, Doreen, died giving birth to her brother, who himself died two days later. Unable to raise Catherine, her father Harold sent the girl to live with her maternal grandparents. When she was aged 10, a custody dispute resulted in Harold regaining sole custody of Catherine.

Catherine met David Birnie at age 12 and began a relationship with him two years later. Her father pleaded with her on several occasions to leave David due to the fact that her involvement with him led to her getting into trouble with the local police. But his disapproval of their relationship only strengthened their union.

Her time in prison throughout her adolescent years offered Catherine a chance to break away from David. Encouraged by a parole officer, Catherine began working for the McLaughlin family as a housekeeper. She married Donald McLaughlin on her 21st birthday.

She and McLaughlin had seven children; their firstborn, a son, was struck and killed by a car in infancy.

In 1985, she left her husband and six children and went to live with David. The couple was never legally married, but Catherine changed her surname by deed poll to Birnie.

Crimes
Over a period of five weeks, the Birnies abducted five women, aged between 15 and 31. All of the victims, except for one, were raped and murdered. The sole exception was their final victim, who escaped the day after her abduction and led police to the Birnie house, thus ending their crime spree.

Victims

Mary Neilson
22-year-old Mary Neilson was studying psychology at the University of Western Australia and working part-time in a delicatessen when she met David Birnie at the spare parts yard where he worked. David offered to sell her cheap tyres for her car, and subsequently gave her his phone number. On 6 October 1986, she went to the Birnies' house. She was gagged, chained to the bed and raped by David while Catherine observed. She was taken to Gleneagle, near Albany Highway in Bedfordale where she was raped again and strangled with a nylon cord. He then stabbed her thinking that it would speed up the decomposition as he "read that in a book somewhere", and they buried her in a shallow grave. She would have received her degree for psychology from the university one year after her murder.

Susannah Candy
Two weeks after the murder of Mary Neilson, they abducted 16-year-old Susannah Candy as she hitchhiked along Stirling Highway in Claremont, Australia. She was an outstanding student at Hollywood Senior High School, and lived at home with her parents and siblings in Nedlands, Australia.

Her father is one of the top ophthalmic surgeons in Western Australia. After she went missing, the Birnies forced her to send letters to her family to assure them that she was all right. But the family feared for her life.

The Birnies had been cruising for hours looking for a victim when they spotted Candy. Once she entered the car she was held at knifepoint while her hands were tied together. She was taken back to the Willagee house where she was gagged, chained to the bed and raped.

After Birnie had finished raping the girl, Catherine Birnie got into the bed with them. She now knew that this turned David on. When they had both assaulted her, Birnie tried to strangle the girl with the nylon cord, but she became hysterical. The Birnies forced sleeping pills down her throat to calm her down. Once Candy was asleep, David put the cord around her neck and told Catherine to prove her undying love for him by murdering the girl.

Catherine complied with the demand and killed Candy while David watched. When asked later why she did it, Catherine said: "Because I wanted to see how strong I was within my inner self. I didn't feel a thing. It was like I expected. I was prepared to follow him to the end of the earth and do anything to see that his desires were satisfied. She was a female. Females hurt and destroy males."

They buried Candy near the grave of Mary Neilson in the State Forest.

Noelene Patterson
On November 1st, they saw 31-year-old Noelene Patterson standing beside her car on the Canning Highway; she had run out of fuel while on her way home from her job as bar manager at the Nedlands Golf Club. Once inside the car, she had a knife held to her throat, was tied up, and told not to move. She was taken back to Moorhouse Street where David repeatedly raped her after she was gagged and chained to the bed. The Birnies originally decided to murder her that same night, but David kept her prisoner in the house for three days and there were signs that he had developed an emotional attachment to Patterson. Catherine quickly became jealous and made an ultimatum: David would have to kill Patterson or Catherine would kill herself. He immediately forced an overdose of sleeping pills down Patterson's throat and strangled her while she slept. They took her body to the forest but buried it away from the others. Catherine reportedly got great pleasure from throwing sand on Patterson's face.

Denise Brown

On 5 November, the Birnies abducted 21-year-old Denise Brown as she was waiting for a bus on Stirling Highway. She accepted a ride from them, and at knifepoint, was taken to the house in Willagee, chained to the bed and raped. The following afternoon she was taken to the Wanneroo pine plantation. In the seclusion of the forest, David Birnie raped Brown in the car while the couple waited for darkness. After they dragged Brown from the car, David Birnie raped her again and stabbed Brown in the neck. Convinced that the girl was dead, they dug a shallow grave and laid her body in it, but Brown sat up in the grave. David Birnie then grabbed an axe, struck her twice in the head, and buried her body in the grave.

Kate Moir 
Seventeen-year-old Kate Moir was abducted at knifepoint after accepting a ride from the Birnies. Moir later stated that she asked them if they intended to kill or rape her, and was informed: "we'll only rape you if you're good". She was forced to dance for them, and slept in the couple's bed while handcuffed to David. Moir was their final abductee and the only victim to survive. After abducting her, David held a knife to her throat and forced her to ring her mother. Moir assured her mother that she had too much to drink and was staying at a friend's house, hoping her mother would realise it was a ruse, and call the friend, knowing she was not a drinker.

She escaped the day after her capture. After David went to work, Catherine went to the door to carry out a drug deal, and forgot to chain Moir to the bed. She escaped by climbing through a closed window by breaking its lock; however, she hit her head on the concrete. After knocking on various neighbours' doors, she jumped a gate and was attacked by David’s dog. She managed to flee, and ran into a vacuum cleaner shop on 10 November 1986. She later described herself as "hysterical. I'm barefoot wearing my black leggings, a black singlet, no knickers...". She informed the shop owner that she had been raped. When the police arrived, she said she had been abducted at knifepoint by a couple who had taken her back to their house and raped her. The police were initially skeptical of her story, but 22-year-old Constable Laura Handcock believed her from the outset, due to the amount of detail she provided, including their address and telephone number. The Birnies had given themselves aliases, but Moir had read David's name on a medicine bottle. Moir stated they had watched the film Rocky on VHS, and described a drawing she had concealed in the house as proof of her presence. Subsequently, the police found her drawing in the home, as well as the VHS copy of Rocky in the Birnie's VCR. David and Catherine were arrested, and during their interviews, they gave conflicting information; Catherine denied ever meeting Moir, while David insisted Moir had come to their house voluntarily to engage in consensual sex. Detective Sergeant Vince Katich convinced David to confess, and reveal where they had buried the bodies so that they could be dug up before dark; David revealed there were four graves.

Other possible victims 
There is speculation that the Birnies were responsible for the disappearance of Cheryl Renwick in May 1986, and Barbara Western in June 1986. It has been suggested that David was responsible for the disappearance of Lisa Marie Mott in 1980; however, his first wife accounted for his whereabouts on the day Mott disappeared.

Trial and sentencing

When sent to trial, David Birnie pleaded guilty to four counts of murder and one count each of abduction and rape. When asked why he had pleaded guilty, he gestured toward the victims' families and said, "It's the least I could do." He was sentenced to four terms of life imprisonment. After being found sane enough to stand trial, Catherine Birnie was also sentenced to four terms of life imprisonment by the Supreme Court of Western Australia; under law at the time, both were required to serve 20 years before being eligible for parole.

Imprisonment
Initially, David was held at the maximum-security Fremantle Prison, but he was soon moved to solitary confinement to keep him from coming to harm from other prisoners. Three of the original death row cells were converted for him and he stayed there until the prison was closed in 1991. The cell can occasionally be viewed on the True Crime Tour held daily at Fremantle Prison. While incarcerated, the Birnies exchanged more than 2,600 letters but were not allowed any other form of contact.

David Birnie was found dead in his cell at Casuarina Prison on 7 October 2005 at 4:30am (WST). He was 54 years old. An inquest found that he had hanged himself from an air vent using a length of cord. Various factors led to his suicide; a failure to provide him with his anti-depressants had exacerbated his depression, his computer had been confiscated and he was suspected of sexually assaulting another prisoner. He was described by a former prison officer as a 'model prisoner' who looked after injured animals. Catherine was not allowed to attend his funeral.

Catherine Birnie is imprisoned in Bandyup Women's Prison. Since being incarcerated she has worked as a prison librarian and appeared in a prison production of Nunsense. In 2007, her parole application was rejected and the then Attorney-General of Western Australia, Jim McGinty, said that her release was unlikely while he remained in office.
 
Her case was to be reviewed again in January 2010; however, on 14 March 2009, new Western Australian Attorney-General Christian Porter, following requests from the victims' families, determined she would stay in jail for life. This decision makes her the third Australian woman (after Katherine Knight and Patricia Byers) to have her papers marked "never to be released". Her appeal of this decision was turned down in March 2010 by Porter. Her fourth bid for parole was declined in 2016. In 2016, Kate Moir—the Birnies' final victim—began a campaign to end Western Australian laws that automatically put convicts up for parole every three years. Moir has stated Birnie has never even applied for parole. In 2017, Catherine Birnie‘s youngest son, under the alias Peter, called for her execution. He has stated that his relation to Birnie has resulted in him being assaulted on multiple occasions. He supports Moir's campaign.

Media

The case was included in Season 1, Episode 6 ("The Moorhouse Horrors") of Crime Investigation Australia, first aired 2005.

The case formed an episode of Australian Families of Crime. Nine Network Australia (2010).

The case was covered by Casefile True Crime Podcast on 27 August 2016.

On 9 November 2017, the case was discussed by Georgia Hardstark in an episode of the podcast My Favorite Murder.

The case was detailed on episode 75 of the True Crime All the Time podcast on 22 April 2018.

The 2016 Australian film Hounds of Love is based on several true murders, but most closely resembles the Moorhouse Murders.

Both Catherine and David Birnie were also featured on Deadly Women in the 8th episode from Season 3 called "Fatal Obsession."

The case was covered by Morbid: A True Crime Podcast on May 8, 2021 as a part of a two episode series, titled "Episode 230: Catherine & David Birnie Part 1" and "Episode 231: Catherine & David Birnie Part 2"
The case was also covered by The Serialholic podcast on July 3, 2019 titled "David & Catherine Birnie"

See also
List of serial killers by country

References

Bibliography

External links

20th-century Australian criminals
Australian murderers of children
Australian people convicted of murder
Australian people convicted of rape
Australian prisoners sentenced to life imprisonment
Australian rapists
Australian serial killers
Criminal duos
Criminals from Western Australia
Married couples
People convicted of murder by Western Australia
People from Perth, Western Australia
Prisoners sentenced to life imprisonment by Western Australia